En Vivo is a live album by Malpaís.

Track listing
"Presagio"
"El bazar de Urías"
"Abril"
"Rosa de un día"
"Bolero yo"
"Muchacha y luna"
"Otro lugar"
"Es tan tarde ya"
"Historia de nadie"
"La vieja"
"Contramarea"
"Malpaís"
"Son inú"
"Como un pájaro"

References

Malpaís (group) albums
Spanish-language live albums
2004 live albums